Riverside Park Water Reclamation Facility is the largest wastewater treatment plant for Spokane, capable of handling up to 150 million gallons a day. During low flow periods, the outflow of the plant comprises up to 20% of the Spokane River's water. Until its construction in 1952 (completed 1958), Spokane dumped raw sewage into the Spokane River resulting in recurrent Typhoid fever outbreaks. A $126 million upgrade to increase capacity to  a day began in 2016, also adding sub-micron membrane technology filtration. It is part of Spokane's $300 million integrated water quality plan.

See also
Riverside State Park, namesake, across Spokane River

References

External links

 

Sewage treatment plants in Washington (state)
Buildings and structures in Spokane County, Washington
1952 establishments in Washington (state)